Matthew James Skelhon (born 30 October 1984) is a British sport shooter. At the 2008 Summer Paralympics he won the gold medal in the SH1 10 metre prone air rifle event.

Life
Skelhon lost the use of his legs following a car accident. He competes in the SH1 Paralympic classification for pistol and rifle competitors that do not require a shooting stand. He started shooting competitively when he joined the Disabled Target Shooting Association of Great Britain in April 2006 after discovering his talent at the WheelPower Inter Spinal Unit Games. Two months later he won a silver medal in the national championships. He became a member of Whittlesey Rifle Club and was named as part of a four-man shooting squad for Great Britain at the 2008 Summer Paralympics.

At the Games Skelhon competed in two events; the men's standing air rifle and the mixed-sex prone air rifle. He finished 18th of 26 athletes in the qualification round of the standing air rifle and did not advance to the medal round. In the qualification round of the prone air rifle Skelhon and Chinese shooter Zhang Cuiping each shot a perfect 600 out of 600 to equal the world record. In the 10-shot medal round Skelhon shot a further 104.9 for a total score of 704.9, enough to beat Zhang by half a point and win the gold medal. On his return from the Games to his home village of Stilton Skelhon was greeted by more than 200 friends, relatives and fans lining streets decked with balloons and banners. In December 2008 he was presented with the Outstanding Individual Achievement award at the 13th annual British Wheelchair Sports Awards.

In 2009 he won a gold medal in the 10 m air rifle prone SH1 and a silver in 10 m air rifle standing SH1 at the Polish Open and four silver medals at the Wheelpower National Shooting Championship. Competing alongside Nathan Milgate and Deanna Coates Skelhon took gold in the team 10 m air rifle prone SH1 at the 2010 World Cup event in Turkey. At the same event he won silver in the individual 10 m air rifle prone SH1 and bronze in the falling target rifle SH1.

Private life
Skelhon's partner is fellow paralympic shooter Issy Bailey.

See also
Great Britain at the 2008 Summer Paralympics
Shooting at the 2008 Summer Paralympics

References

External links
 

1984 births
Living people
British male sport shooters
Paralympic shooters of Great Britain
Paralympic gold medalists for Great Britain
Paralympic silver medalists for Great Britain
Paralympic bronze medalists for Great Britain
Paralympic medalists in shooting
Shooters at the 2008 Summer Paralympics
Shooters at the 2012 Summer Paralympics
Medalists at the 2008 Summer Paralympics
Medalists at the 2012 Summer Paralympics
People from Stilton
Shooters at the 2020 Summer Paralympics
21st-century British people